Apodrassus is a monotypic genus of South American ground spiders containing the single species, Apodrassus andinus. It was first described by R. V. Chamberlin in 1916, and has only been found in Peru.

References

Gnaphosidae
Monotypic Araneomorphae genera
Spiders of South America